The Anglican Church of St Peter and St Paul in  Odcombe, Somerset, England was built in the 13th century. It is a Grade II* listed building.

History

The church has 13th-century origins and was restored in the 15th.

In 1874 transepts were added and the church restored.

The parish is part of the Ham Hill benefice within the Diocese of Bath and Wells.

Architecture

The Ham stone building has clay tile roofs. It consists of a three-bay nave and two-bay chancel with transepts, vestry and porch. The central two-stage tower is supported by corner buttresses with pinnacles. It is decorated with gargoyles. The tower holds six bells.

Most of the interior fittings are from the 19th century, but the purbeck stone font is much older. There is a memorial to the travel writer Thomas Coryate who lived in the village around 1600, and a replica of a pair of his shoes.

A headstone in yellow Jaisalmer stone lies embedded in the front lawn of the church to mark a memorial service to poet Dom Moraes (1938-2004).

See also  
 List of ecclesiastical parishes in the Diocese of Bath and Wells

References

Grade II* listed buildings in South Somerset
Grade II* listed churches in Somerset
Church of England church buildings in South Somerset
Hamstone buildings